Thomas J. Bethel is an American labor leader.  He was elected national president of American Maritime Officers in 2008. He was reelected as AMO National President in 2010. He had been appointed as the national president of the American Maritime Officers union (AMO) on January 8, 2007 by the union's National Executive Committee. Bethel formerly served as AMO's national executive vice-president, which is the third highest position in the union.

Bethel sailed with AMO as a Chief Engineer for several years before being named a union representative in 1986.  He later served as an executive board member and as the national assistant vice president at large.

Now in its eighth year under Bethel's leadership, the union's administration is pioneering job opportunities for the AMO membership in the U.S. and international fleets and operates with the hallmarks of transparency in operations and open communication with the membership. An independent firm administers union elections and referendums. A hotline and compliance committee have been established for officials and employees to report any instances of abuse or misconduct. Attendance of National Executive Board meetings has been opened to the union's membership. Bethel has actively sought the input of former unsuccessful candidates for union office in an effort to harvest new ideas for improving the union's performance and service to the membership.

See also

 Michael McKay
 Michael Sacco
 American Maritime Officers
 Seafarers International Union

References

External links
American Maritime Officers website

American trade union leaders
Year of birth missing (living people)
Living people